Henry W. Corbett (1827–1903) was a U.S. Senator from Oregon from 1867 to 1873. Senator Corbett may also refer to:

Alfred H. Corbett (1915–2000), Oregon State Senate
Ellen Corbett (born 1954), California State Senate
Henry L. Corbett (1881–1957), Oregon State Senate

See also
William C. Corbitt (1854–1922), Virginia State Senate